Haytham Ahmed Abdel Hamid Sehrty (born 26 August 1985) is an Egyptian former basketball player. He played his entire 14-year career for Zamalek.

Professional career
From 2008, Elsaharty played for Zamalek in his native Egypt. He was the captain of the roster for the 2021 BAL season, where the team won the first-ever BAL championship. After the team won the 2021 Egyptian Super League, Elsaharty announced his retirement.

BAL career statistics

|-
|style="text-align:left;background:#afe6ba;"|2021†
|style="text-align:left;"|Zamalek
| 1 || 0 || 6.3 || .000 || – || – || .0 || .0 || .0 || .0 || .0
|- class="sortbottom"
| style="text-align:center;" colspan="2"|Career
| 1 || 0 || 6.3 || .000 || – || – || .0 || .0 || .0 || .0 || .0

External links
RealGM profile
AfroBasket profile

References

1985 births
Living people
Egyptian men's basketball players
Small forwards
Zamalek SC basketball players